Conchas Lake Seaplane Base  is a public use seaplane base located two nautical miles (4 km) southwest of the central business district of Conchas Dam, in San Miguel County, New Mexico, United States. It is owned by the U.S. Army Corps of Engineers. It has one seaplane landing area measuring 21,120 by 1,320 feet (6,437 by 402 m).

See also 
Conchas Lake Airport

References

External links 

Airports in New Mexico
Seaplane bases in the United States
Transportation in San Miguel County, New Mexico
Buildings and structures in San Miguel County, New Mexico